Marvin Fredrick Bateman (born April 5, 1950) is a former American football punter in the National Football League for the Dallas Cowboys and Buffalo Bills. He played college football at the University of Utah.

Early years
Bateman attended Highland High School, where he competed in football, basketball and baseball. He accepted a football scholarship from the University of Utah. He led the nation in punting in his last 2 years and became the first Utah football player to receive first-team All-American honors two years in a row.

As a senior, he set school records for average yards per punt (48.07) and total punt yardage (3,269). During his college career he was also the team's placekicker, making 21 field goals (sixth in school history), converting 51 percent of his attempts and had a school record 59 yard field goal.

In 1987, he was inducted into the Utah Sports Hall of Fame. In 2004, he was inducted into the University of Utah Crimson Club Hall of Fame.

Professional career

Dallas Cowboys
Bateman was selected by the Dallas Cowboys in the third round  (78th overall) of the 1972 NFL Draft and became the starter, after the team traded Pro Bowl punter Ron Widby to the Green Bay Packers along with cornerback Ike Thomas, in exchange for a 1973 second round draft choice (#46-Golden Richards).

As a rookie, his progress was slowed by a sprained ankle he suffered in the second game of the season. He averaged a disappointing 38.2 yards per punt, but still received NFL All-Rookie honors. 

In 1973, he improved his average to 41.6 yards per punt. He missed one game after suffering a collision against the Washington Redskins. He was the backup placekicker and made an extra point in his only attempt.

On October 30, 1974, he was released because of poor performances and replaced with Duane Carrell.

Buffalo Bills
On November 13, 1974, the Buffalo Bills signed him as a free agent to replace Spike Jones. He led the NFL two years in a row in net yards per punt. 

In 1976, he led the NFL in punting average (42.8 yards), but his net average was only 28.7 yards, although he had a 78-yard punt, which still stands as the longest punt in team history. On August 24, 1978, he was released after walking out of camp because of a contract dispute.

San Francisco 49ers
On May 3, 1979, he signed with the San Francisco 49ers. He was released on August 14.

St. Louis Cardinals
On July 16, 1980, he signed with the St. Louis Cardinals. He was released on August 26.

References

External links
Discipline punted Bateman to Top

1950 births
Living people
Players of American football from Salt Lake City
American football punters
Utah Utes football players
Dallas Cowboys players
Buffalo Bills players